Russian sanctions against Ukraine were put into effect by the November 1, 2018, Order of the Government of Russia No. 1300   in pursuance of the October 22, 2018 Decree of the President of Russia  No. 592.

The decree imposed economic sanctions on 322 Ukrainian citizens and 68 Ukrainian companies. The sanctions affect only the assets of the listed persons and companies within the territory of Russia.

References

Russia–Ukraine relations
Sanctions and boycotts during the Russo-Ukrainian War
2018 in international relations
Political history of Russia
Boycotts of Ukraine
2018 in economics
2018 in Russia
Anti-Ukrainian sentiment